Auburn Stadium may refer to:

Auburn Stadium (New South Wales), now Oriole Park, Sydney, Australia.
Auburn Stadium (Alabama), now Jordan–Hare Stadium, Auburn, Alabama, United States.